is a Japanese film director. He won the award for Best Director at the 1st Yokohama Film Festival for The Man Who Stole the Sun.

Life and career
Hasegawa began his career in film at Nikkatsu in the early 1970s as a scriptwriter on such Roman porno projects as Chūsei Sone's Love Bandit Rat Man (1972), Yukihiro Sawada's Retreat Through the Wet Wasteland (1973) and Tatsumi Kumashiro's Evening Primrose (1974). He also served as Assistant Director on the 1972 Woman on the Night Train and several other Roman porno films for Nikkatsu.

After leaving Nikkatsu, he made his debut as a director in the October 1976 The Youth Killer, produced by ATG, a provocative study of alienation focusing on a young killer. In 1979, he directed his second film, the black comedy The Man Who Stole the Sun, which won him the Best Director award at the 1979 Yokohama Film Festival. This was Hasegawa's last film and although he never returned to directing, he was one of the founding members of the Director's Company in 1982 where he devoted himself to helping young directors.

He has also occasionally appeared as an actor, including a role in Banmei Takahashi's 1982 , produced by Director's Company, and later in Seijun Suzuki's 1991 Yumeji.

Filmography
  (1976)
 The Man Who Stole the Sun (1979)

References

1946 births
Hibakusha
Living people
Japanese film directors
People from Hiroshima Prefecture